Osceola High School is a public school serving grades 9 through 12 in Osceola, Polk County, Wisconsin, United States. The motto of Osceola High School is "World class education with a small town feel." The small town of Osceola is located on the St. Croix River.

Athletics 
Osceola High School offers tennis, volleyball, football, dance line, cross country running, golf, basketball, wrestling, baseball, softball, track, and soccer under Wisconsin Interscholastic Athletic Association regulations. The school's nickname is the Chieftains.

References

External links
Osceola School District
City of Osceola, Wisconsin

Public high schools in Wisconsin
Schools in Polk County, Wisconsin